Dhanyee Meye is a 1971 Bengali romantic comedy film directed by Arabinda Mukhopadhyay. The cast includes Uttam Kumar, Sabitri Chatterjee, Partho Mukherjee, Jaya Bhaduri, Jahor Roy and Nripati Chattopadhyay. This is the third and only the second Bengali film of Jaya Baduri who become the popular actress in Hindi cinema. The noted music of the film composed by Nachiketa Ghosh.

Plot
The story centers around the character of Bogola (Partha Mukherjee); who is the younger brother of Kali Dutta (Uttam Kumar). Bogola is the captain of a football team Sarbamangala Club managed by his elder brother. The team goes to a village Harbhanga to play in the finals of the Nangteshwar Shield. Monosha (Jaya Bhaduri)'s maternal uncle (mama) Gobordhan Chowdhury (Jahar Ray) is the president of the local football club and after losing the ancestral "Nangteshwar shield" (named after his father, Nangteshwar Chowdhury); decides to forcefully marry off Monosha (Jaya Bhaduri) and Bogola (Partha Mukherjee) to Keep the "Shield" in the family. All matters are soon resolved because Monosha and Bogola love each other.

Cast
Uttam Kumar as Kali Dutta (Bagla's brother)
 Sabitri Chatterjee as Bagla's sister-in-law
 Partho Mukherjee as Bagla
 Jaya Bhaduri as Mansa
 Jahor Roy as Gobardhan Choudhury
 Nripati Chattopadhyay as Gobardhan's masseur
 Tapen Chatterjee as Ghanta
 Sunil Das Gupta as Bairagi
 Sukhen Das as Nera (commentator)
 Salil Dutta
 Rabi Ghosh as Bhattacharjee (Totla Bhattacharjee-village priest)
 Tapati Ghosh as Tapan's wife
 Anubha Gupta as Gobardhan's wife
 Tarun Kumar Chatterjee as the doctor
 Shyam Laha as Nafar Ghosh
 Haridhan Mukherjee as Gobardhan's yes-man
 Chinmoy Roy as the lawyer
 Kalyan Chatterjee
 [Sambhu Bhattacharya]

Soundtrack

Songs become huge popular to audiences even today. Specially the song Sob Khelar Sera Bangalir Tumi Football become a cultural issue amongst the Bengali's.

References

External links
 

1971 films
Indian black-and-white films
Bengali-language Indian films
1971 romantic comedy films
Indian romantic comedy films
1970s Bengali-language films